Muzvezve is a town in Zimbabwe located in Mashonaland West Province. Its population was 12091 in 2007.

References 

Populated places in Mashonaland West Province